In the theory of partially ordered sets, a pseudoideal is a subset characterized by a bounding operator LU.

Basic definitions 
LU(A) is the set of all lower bounds of the set of all upper bounds of the subset A of a partially ordered set.

A  subset I of a partially ordered set (P, ≤) is a Doyle pseudoideal, if the following condition holds:

For every finite subset S of P that has a supremum in P, if  then .

A  subset I of a partially ordered set (P, ≤) is a pseudoideal, if the following condition holds:

For every subset S of P having at most two elements that has a supremum in P, if S  I  then LU(S)  I.

Remarks
Every Frink ideal I is a Doyle pseudoideal.
A subset I of a lattice (P, ≤) is a  Doyle pseudoideal if and only if it is a lower set that is closed under finite joins (suprema).

Related notions
Frink ideal

References
Abian, A., Amin, W. A. (1990) "Existence of prime ideals and ultrafilters in partially ordered sets", Czechoslovak Math. J., 40: 159–163.
Doyle, W.(1950) "An arithmetical theorem for partially ordered sets", Bulletin of the American  Mathematical Society, 56: 366.
Niederle, J. (2006) "Ideals in ordered sets", Rendiconti del Circolo Matematico di Palermo 55: 287–295.

Order theory